Major Cecil Leonard Knox VC (9 May 1889 − 4 February 1943) was an English recipient of the Victoria Cross, the highest and most prestigious award for gallantry in the face of the enemy that can be awarded to British and Commonwealth forces.

Family background 

Cecil Knox was born in Nuneaton in 1889, the son of James and Florence Knox. The family were prominent in civil and railway engineering and had become affluent through their majority shareholding in the Haunchwood Brick and Tile Company. James was one of nine sons who all fought in the First World War. James Meldrum Knox of the Royal Warwickshire Regiment was awarded the DSO & bar, and T. K. Knox gained the Military Cross and bar.

Details
Educated at Oundle School, he was 29 years old and a temporary second lieutenant in the 150th Field Company, Corps of Royal Engineers, British Army during the First World War when the following deed took place for which he was awarded the VC.

On 22 March 1918 at Tugny-et-Pont, Aisne, France, Second Lieutenant Knox was entrusted with the demolition of 12 bridges. He successfully carried out this task, but in the case of one steel girder bridge the time fuse failed to act, and without hesitation he ran to the bridge under heavy fire, and when the enemy were actually on it, he tore away the time fuse and lit the instantaneous fuse, to do which he had to get under the bridge. As a practical civil engineer, Second Lieutenant Knox undoubtedly realised the grave risk he took in doing this.

Between the wars he joined the Royal Auxiliary Air Force and suffered from a serious parachute accident. He joined the Home Guard at the beginning of World War II and achieved the rank of major. He died as the result of a motoring accident (his motorcycle having skidded on an icy road).

References

Bibliography
Monuments to Courage (David Harvey, 1999)
The Register of the Victoria Cross (This England, 1997)
The Sapper VCs (Gerald Napier, 1998)
VCs of the First World War: Spring Offensive 1918 (Gerald Gliddon, 1997)

External links
Royal Engineers Museum Sappers VCs
Location of grave and VC medal (Leicestershire)

See also

William Neilly

1889 births
1943 deaths
British military personnel killed in World War II
Burials in Leicestershire
People from Nuneaton
Royal Engineers officers
British World War I recipients of the Victoria Cross
British Army personnel of World War I
British Home Guard officers
Road incident deaths in England
British Army recipients of the Victoria Cross
Motorcycle road incident deaths
Military personnel from Warwickshire